Harpagoherpia is a genus of sterrofustian solenogasters, marine shell-less, worm-like mollusks.

References

Sterrofustia